The modern International Boxing Hall of Fame (IBHOF), located in Canastota, New York, honors boxers, trainers and other contributors to the sport worldwide. Inductees are selected by members of the Boxing Writers Association of America. The IBHOF started as a 1990 initiative by Ed Brophy to honour Canastota's world boxing champions, Carmen Basilio and Basilio's nephew, Billy Backus; the village of Canastota inaugurated the new museum, which showcases boxing's rich history. It is visited by boxing fans from all over the world.

An earlier hall had been created in 1954, when The Ring magazine's Boxing Hall of Fame was launched, located at Madison Square Garden in New York City. When that Boxing Hall of Fame was disbanded in 1987, it had a total of 155 inductees. , all but 14 of those 155 have also been inducted to the IBHOF. Beginning in 2020, the IBHOF began inducting female boxers for the first time since its inception.

The IBHOF is one of two recognised Boxing Halls of Fame with the other being the World Boxing Hall of Fame (WBHF), with the IBHOF being the more widely recognised institution.

Ceremonies are held each year to honour inductees, but were postponed in 2020 and 2021 due to COVID-19. Events are attended by many former world boxing champions, as well as boxing and Hollywood celebrities. Artist Richard T. Slone has been the official artist of the IBHOF since 1997, creating portraits of inductees and other works for the Hall.

Eligibility

Professional boxers become eligible for election into the International Boxing Hall of Fame five (sometimes four) years after their retirement. Inductees are selected by members of the Boxing Writers Association of America and an international panel of boxing historians, based on criteria in five separate categories:

 Modern: Retired boxers whose last bout was no earlier than 1989. Prior to a 2014 rule change, the category reflected boxers whose last bout was after 1943.
 Old Timers: Until 2014, the rule was boxers whose last bout was no earlier than 1893 and no later than 1942. This category has since changed, similar to the Veterans Committee in baseball's Hall of Fame. It is now split into two categories.
 Early Era: Boxers who fought from the beginning of Marquis of Queensbury Rules (1893) until 1942.
 Late Era: Boxers who fought their bout from 1943 to 1988 
 Pioneers: Boxers whose last bout was in or prior to 1892. Generally, they are boxers who fought before the Marquis of Queensbury Rules.
 Observers: Journalists, historians, writers and artists.
 Non-Participants: People who made contributions to the sport of boxing apart from their roles as boxers or observers.

Inductees

Modern

Old Timers
Records per ibhof.com unless otherwise stated.

Pioneers

Non-participants

Whitey Esneault (2016)
Howard Grant (2019)
Johnny Addie (2018)
Thomas S. Andrews (1992)
Ray Arcel (1991)
Bob Arum (1999)
Jarvis Astaire (2006)
Giuseppe Ballarati (1999)
George Benton (2001)
Ignacio Beristáin (2011)
Al Bernstein (2012)
A.F. Bettinson (2011)
Whitey Bimstein (2006)
Jack Blackburn (1992)
William A. Brady (1998)
Umberto Branchini (2004)
Teddy Brenner (1993)
Freddie Brown (2021)
Amilcar Brusa (2007)
Michael Buffer (2012)
Bill Cayton (2005)
John Graham Chambers (1990)
Don Chargin (2001)
Stanley Christodoulou (2004)
Gil Clancy (1993)
Irving Cohen (2002)
James W. Coffroth (1991)
Cuco Conde (2007)
Joe Cortez (2011)
Cus D'Amato (1995)
Lou DiBella (2020)
Jeff Dickson (2000)
Arthur Donovan (1993)
Mickey Duff (1999)
Angelo Dundee (1994)
Chris Dundee (1994)
Don Dunphy (1993)
Dan Duva (2003)
Lou Duva (1998)
Pierce Egan (1991)
Don Elbaum (2019)
Shelly Finkel (2010)
Nat Fleischer (1990)
Richard Kyle Fox (1997)
Dewey Fragetta (2003)
Don Fraser (2005)
Eddie Futch (1994)
Billy Gibson (2009)
Charley Goldman (1992)
Ruby Goldstein (1994)
Bob Goodman (2009)
Brad Goodman (2023)
Murray Goodman (1999)
Dan Goossen (2020)
Joe Goossen (2023)
Bill Gore (2008)
Abe J. Greene (2009)
Larry Hazzard (2010)
Barry Hearn  (2014)
Akihiko Honda (2009)
Joe Humphreys (1997)
Sam Ichinose (2001)
Brad Jacobs (2023)
Jimmy Jacobs (1993)
Mike Jacobs (1990)
Jimmy Johnston (1999)
Guy Jutras (2019)
J. P. Leo "Jack 'Doc' Kearns" McKernan (1990)
Don King (1997)
Klaus-Peter Kohl (2018)
Mills Lane (2013)
Tito Lectoure (1997)
Harold Lederman (2015)
A.J. Liebling (1992)
Hugh, Earl of Lonsdale (1996)
Harry Markson (1992)
John, Marquess of Queensberry (1990)
Jackie McCoy (2021)
Arthur Mercante (1995)
Dan Morgan (2000)
William Muldoon (1996)
Gilbert Odd (1995)
Tom O'Rourke (1999)
Mogens Palle (2008)
Dan Parker (1996)
George Parnassus (1991)
J Russell Peltz (2004)
Tex Rickard (1990)
Freddie Roach (2012)
Irving Rudd (1999)
Rodolfo Sabbatini (2006)
Lee Samuels (2019)
Lope Sarreal (2005)
Wilfried Sauerland (2010)
George Siler (1995)
Sam Silverman (2002)
Jack Solomons (1995)
Sylvester Stallone (2010)
Richard Steele (2014)
Emanuel Steward (1997)
José Sulaimán (2007)
Sam Taub (1995)
Herman Taylor (1998)
Bruce Trampler (2010)
Rip Valenti (2012)
Lou Viscusi (2004)
Jimmy Walker (1992)
Frank Warren (2008)
Al Weill (2003)
Steve Smoger (2015)

Observers

Seth Abraham (2023)
Steve Albert (2018)
Dave Anderson (2008)
Teddy Atlas (2019)
Lester Bromberg (2001)
Jimmy Cannon (2002)
Harry Carpenter (2011)
Ralph Citro (2001)
Howard Cosell (2010)
Tad Dorgan (2007)
Steve Farhood (2017)
Bernard Fernandez (2020)
Jack Fiske (2003)
Paul Gallico (2009)
Bill Gallo (2001)
Jim Gray (2018)
Reg Gutteridge (2002)
Thomas Hauser (2020)
W.C. Heinz (2004)
Jersey Jones (2005)
Hank Kaplan (2006)
Michael Katz (2012)
George Kimball (2021)
Joe Koizumi (2008)
Jim Lampley (2015)
Jay Larkin (2021)
Mario Rivera Martino (2019)
Hugh McIlvanney (2009)
Larry Merchant (2009)
Harry Mullan (2005)
Barney Nagler (2004)
LeRoy Neiman (2007)
Damon Runyon (2002)
Tim Ryan (2023)
Budd Schulberg (2003)
Ed Schuyler (2010)
Herbert "Bert" Sugar (2005)
Stanley Weston (2006)

Women's Modern

Women's Trailblazer

Women non-participants

Aileen Eaton (2002)
Lorraine Chargin (2018)
Kathy Duva (2020)
Dr. Margaret Goodman (2021)

See also 
 Bare Knuckle Boxing Hall of Fame
 Women's International Boxing Hall of Fame

References

External links

 International Boxing Hall of Fame official website

Boxing museums and halls of fame
Halls of fame in New York (state)

Museums in Madison County, New York
Sports museums in New York (state)